Jomfruens Egede is a manor house located three kilometres north-west of Faxe, a small town some 40 km south of Copenhagen, Denmark. It owes its current appearance to Sophie Amalie Moth who in the late 18th century altered it with the assistance of Caspar Frederik Harsdorff and Joseph Christian Lillie. The National Museum of Denmark has described it as possibly the finest example from the period.

History

Early history
Jomfruens Egede traces its history back to 1346 when it was owned by Uffe Pedersen Neb, a loyal supporter of King Valdemar IV, and known as Egedegaard. Etymologically, Egede- derives from an old form 'large oak forest' while -gaard means 'farm' or 'manor'. Its name, which means 'Egede of the Lady' refers to two unmarried noble women, Ermegaard and Birgitte Bille, who in 1542 inherited the estate from their father.

Sophie Amalie Moth and the new house
In 1674 the estate was acquired by King Christian V's mistress, Sophie Amalie Moth, who received official recognition and was appointed Countess of Samsø on 31 December 1677. After Christian V's death in 1699 she retired to the estate where she led a quiet life until her own death in 1719. The property was then owned by their son, Ulrik Christian Gyldenløve, Count of Samsø.

After different owners Jomfruens Egede came to Niels Schack-Rathlou, whose son Christian Schack-Rathlou in the 1790s carried out an expansion and adapted the design of the house with the assistance of the architects Caspar Frederik Harsdorff and Joseph Christian Lillie.

In 1740, Jomfruens Egede was bought by Claus Benedix Beenfeldt who already owned nearby Lystrup Castle. Since that time the two estates have been under the same ownership.

Moltke era
 
In 1931 the estate was bought by Count Adam Wilhelm Moltke who had inherited Bregentved from his father in 1818 and would later become the first Danish Prime Minister after the adoption of the Constitution of Denmark in 1849. Moltke increased his holdings through several other acquisitions, acting as curator of Vallø and Vemmetofte and managing Knuthenborg for Count Frederik Marcus Knuth, the underage nephew of his wife. As a result, he administrated one of the largest complexes of land in the country at the time.

When Christian Moltke inherited Lystrup and Jomfruens Egede from his father, he disrupted his diplomatic career which had brought him to both London and Vienna to concentrate on the management of his estates. Jomfruens Egede has remained in the possession of the Moltke family to this day.

Architecture
Designed in the Neoclassical style, Jomfruens Egede consists of two parallel wings which to the south border on the churchyard of Østre Egede Church.

The house is particularly noted for its interiors which the National Museum of Denmark has described as "possibly the finest example of Danish interior design and furnishings of the late 18th century".

List of owners
 (      -      ) Offe Pedersen Neb
 (      -      ) Peder Offesen Neb
 (      -1391) Ingeborg Nielsdatter Panter
 (1391-1424) Anders Jacobsen Lunge
 (1424-1456) Eline Evertsdatter Moltke, gift 1) Lunge 2) Wardenberg
 (1456-1465) Torben Bille
 (1465-1503) Sidsel Ovesdatter Lunge
 (1503-      ) Arvinger efter Sidsel Ovesdatter Lunge
 (      -1542) Hans Bille
 (1542-1548) Inger Corfitzdatter Rønnow
 (      -1559) Hans Barnekow
 (1542-1587) Birgitte Hansdatter Bille
 (1542-1587) Ermegaard Hansdatter Bille
 (1559-      ) Mette Oxe
 (1587-      ) Ingeborg Andersen Bille
 (      -1631) Tage Andersen Thott
 (1631-1632) Jens Sparre
 (1632-      ) Sidsel Nielsdatter Parsberg, gift Sparre
 (      -1662) Christian Sparre
 (1662-1674) Vincents Joachim Hahn
 (1674-1719) Sophie Amalie Moth
 (1719-      ) Ulrik Christian Gyldenløve
 (      -1721) Boet efter Ulrik Christian Gyldenløves
 (1721-1735) Nicolas Esben Poulsen
 (1735-1740) Enken efter Nicolas Esben Poulsen
 (1740-      ) Claus Benedix Beenfeldt
 (      -1773) Thomas Holmsted Hjelmskiold
 (1773-1776) Christine Ulrikke Beenfeldt
 (1776-1786) Niels Rosenkrantz von Holstein-Rathlou
 (1786-1828) Christian Frederik von Holstein-Rathlou
 (1828-1831) Christiane Elisabeth Friis
 (1831-1857) Adam Wilhelm Moltke
 (1857-1918) Christian Henrik Carl Moltke
 (1918-1943) Aage Vilhelm Christian Moltke
 (1943-1957) Ivar Christian Eiler Moltke
 (1957-1990) Norman Ivar Frederik Moltke
 (1990-      ) Joachim Godske Norman Moltke

References

External links
  
 Official website of Lystrup Gods (in Danish)

Manor houses in Faxe Municipality
Caspar Frederik Harsdorff buildings
Neoclassical architecture in Denmark
Listed buildings and structures in Faxe Municipality
Buildings and structures associated with the Lunge family
Buildings and structures associated with the Bille family
Buildings and structures in Denmark associated with the Moltke family